In organic chemistry, the Ferrario–Ackermann reaction or simply the Ferrario reaction is a name reaction that allow for the generation of phenoxanthiine from diphenyl ether and sulfur in the presence of aluminum chloride catalyst.

References

Name reactions